Gil Orriols Jansana (born 17 January 1977 in Barcelona, Catalonia) is a former Alpine skier and was 2000 champion of the Pierra Menta Jove.

Early life
He made his master's degree in sport and physical education sciences at the University of Barcelona. He holds also a diploma in collective sports from the Institut Nacional d'Educació Física de Catalunya – Byomedic.

Coaching career
Orriols began his coaching career in 2003 with FC Barcelona C in Catalonia, where he served as physical and high performance coach. Mostly coaching Barcelona's youth teams from U-9 to U-20. In 2005 Orriols left Barcelona to go abroad to Canada to sign with the Montreal Impact organization, accepting a physical performance role with the club. In Montreal he was responsible for creating a physical training plan adapted to the constraints of the Impact’s calendar. In August 2006 he accepted an offer from ASPIRE Academy in Qatar, where he was physical trainer until last October, 2009. On November 24, 2009 he returned to Montreal to assume the role of assistant coach and physical performance manager under Marc Dos Santos.

References

External links
 Montreal Impact bio

1977 births
Living people
Spanish football managers
Spanish male alpine skiers